The Clinical Sleep Educator (CSE) certificate was established by the Board of Registered Polysomnographic Technologists (BRPT) in 2012. The role of the CSE, is to communicate "with patients, families, and the community to educate individuals on sleep disorders, good sleep hygiene, ways to optimize treatment, methods to improve and monitor compliance with prescribed treatment, and in general assists patients in eliminating barriers to care in order to maximize their quality of life." This program is not to be confused with another program to be launched by the BRPT in 2014, the Clinical Sleep Health Examination.

To be eligible to become a CSE, the BRPT says, "Licensed and/or certified healthcare professionals are eligible to earn the [CSE] . . ., including nurses, sleep technologists, respiratory care practitioners, psychologists, social workers, physicians, physician assistants and health educators." The two steps to becoming a CSE are for the candidate to take live CSE training class and then pass a test after completing the class.

References

Additional sources
Donna Arand, PhD, "Waking Up to the Sleep Technologist's New Roles," 9 November 2013, in Sleep Review online, at https://web.archive.org/web/20131126033003/http://www.sleepreviewmag.com/business/18755-waking-up-to-the-sleep-technologist-s-new-roles .
"BRPT Offers a New Credential for Sleep Medicine," 6 November 2013, in Sleep Review online, at https://web.archive.org/web/20131126033758/http://www.sleepreviewmag.com/continuing-education/18743-brpt-s-offers-a-new-credential-for-sleep-medicine .
"American Sleep Apnea Association 2.0," 2 May 2013, in sleep Review online, at https://web.archive.org/web/20131002053305/http://www.sleepreviewmag.com/all-news/18463-american-sleep-apnea-association-2-0 .
"Sleep960 and CPAPCoach Launch Online Coaching Sessions for CPAP Users," 28 June 2013, in Sleep Review online, at  https://archive.today/20131213071018/http://www.sleepreviewmag.com/products/18548-sleep960-and-cpapcoach-launch-online-coaching-sessions-for-cpap-users 
Ed Grandi, "Evolution or Revolution: There is a role for Clinical Sleep Educators in sleep medicine-and beyond," June 6, 2012, in Advance for Respiratory Care & Sleep Medicine online, at http://respiratory-care-sleep-medicine.advanceweb.com/Archives/Article-Archives/Evolution-or-Revolution.aspx .
"Sleep School Adds New Faculty to Develop Sleep Medicine Clinical Education Courses," 14 January 2013, in Sleep Review online, at https://web.archive.org/web/20140202160522/http://www.sleepreviewmag.com/continuing-education/18261-sleep-school-adds-new-faculty-to-develop-sleep-medicine-clinical-education-courses .
"FOCUS Conference Provides Crossover Opportunities for Sleep and Respiratory Professionals," 6 April 2011, in Sleep Review online, at https://web.archive.org/web/20140202161212/http://www.sleepreviewmag.com/all-news/17690-focus-conference-provides-crossover-opportunities-for-sleep-and-respiratory-professionals .
"BRPT Announces New Credential For Sleep Medicine," November 9, 2013, in Advance for Respiratory Care & Sleep Medicine online, at http://respiratory-care-sleep-medicine.advanceweb.com/News/Daily-News-Watch/BRPT-Announces-New-Credential-For-Sleep-Medicine.aspx .

Sleep disorders